The 2017 World's Strongest Man was the 40th edition of the World's Strongest Man competition. It was held in Gaborone, Botswana from May 20 to 28. The tournament was won by Eddie Hall of the United Kingdom, with Hafþór Júlíus Björnsson of Iceland second and defending champion Brian Shaw of the United States third. Hall announced after the competition that he would not defend his title. Four-time champion Zydrunas Savickas of Lithuania finished in ninth place; this marked the first time in his career that he failed to finish in the top three after qualifying for the final.

Heat Results
A change was made to the qualifying rounds for 2017. Each group participated in five normal events, with the highest scoring competitor at the end of those events being declared the group winner and automatically qualifying for the final. The lowest scoring competitor was eliminated from further competition. 

In a throwback to early competitions, where a head-to-head competition determined the overall champion, the four remaining competitors faced off in an event called Last Man Standing. The event consisted of a hurdle placed in the middle of an octagon with a white square in the middle, in which was placed an Atlas Stone. 

The event was conducted in a stepladder format, with the fifth place and fourth place competitors beginning the event. Each competitor took turns lifting the stone from their side of the square and dropping it over the hurdle. The lift had to be started from within the square and each competitor was given ten seconds to lift and drop the stone. Once one of them could not complete the task, he was eliminated from the event and the third place competitor stepped in. The survivor of that matchup took on the second place competitor, with the winner of the event joining the overall group winner in the final.

Heat 1

Heat 2

Heat 3

Heat 4

Heat 5

Finals Events Results

Event 1: Tyre Flip
 tyre for 6 flips
Time Limit: 60 seconds

Event 2: Squat Lift
Weight:  for repetitions
Time Limit: 60 seconds

Event 3: Viking Press
Weight:  for repetitions
Time Limit: 60 seconds

Event 4: Plane Pull
Weight: 
Course Length: 
Time Limit: 60 seconds

Event 5: Max Deadlift
Opening Weight:

Event 6: Atlas Stones
 5 Atlas Stone series ranging from 
 Time Limit: 60 seconds

Final standings

References

External links

World's Strongest Man